Swimming at the 2019 Pacific Games in Samoa was held on 8–13 July 2019 at the Samoa Aquatic Centre in Apia, with the Sheraton Samoa Beach Resort in Mulifanua hosting the open water swim.

The aquatic centre, originally built to cater for the 2007 South Pacific Games, was refurbished with assistance from China prior to the 2019 games.

Event schedule
The forty events in the pool – nineteen each for men and women, plus two mixed relays – were spread over five days at the Samoa Aquatic Centre, with heats held in the morning sessions, followed by the finals in the evenings.

The men's and women's open water events were held on Monday 8 July at the Sheraton Samoa Beach Resort.

Teams
The nations competing were:

Medal summary

Medal table

Men's

Women's

Mixed

See also
 Swimming at the Pacific Games

References

External links
Results book

2019 Pacific Games
2019
Pacific Games